Joe I. Tompkins is an American costume designer. He was nominated for Academy Awards in the category Best Costume Design for the films Cross Creek and Harlem Nights.

Selected filmography 
 Cross Creek (1983)
 Harlem Nights (1989)

References

External links 

Living people
Place of birth missing (living people)
Year of birth missing (living people)
American costume designers